= Mithavirana =

- village
- Location in Gujarat, India Mithavirana (India)
- Coordinates: 24.645°N 71.44°E
- Country: India
- State: Gujarat
- District: Banaskantha

Languages
  - Official: Gujarati, Hindi
- Time zone: UTC+5:30 (IST)
- PIN: 385565
- Vehicle registration: GJ-8
- Website: gujaratindia.com

Mithavirana is a small village located in Vav taluka in Vav Tharad district in the Indian state of Gujarat. Mithavirana is old village in Vav.
